Woodbury Ski Area was a ski area located in Woodbury, Connecticut. This small ski area was in northwestern Connecticut, about 2 hours from New York City. The skiing and snow tubing operations were serviced by a chairlift and multiple surface lifts. Local residents referred to it as "Rod's" after its owner, Olympic skier Rod Taylor.

Taylor opened the resort in 1972. Taylor took pride in Woodbury being the first ski area in Connecticut to open each season.

The ski area closed in 2016 following a drought and has not reopened since. It is currently was for sale but has since been bought and its future is uncertain. But may re open in the coming years as work has begun to get the park up and running

References

External links
 Woodbury Ski Area - Official site

Ski areas and resorts in Connecticut
Sports venues in Litchfield County, Connecticut
Woodbury, Connecticut